was an entrepreneur and politician, who served as Minister of Commerce and Industry in post-war Japan.

Ōya was born in what is now part of the town of Meiwa in Gunma Prefecture, where his father was a high school principal and his grandfather had been a samurai in the service of Kawagoe Domain. He graduated from what later became Hitotsubashi University in 1918. On graduation he joined the zaibatsu Suzuki Shoten, and from 1925 went to work for Teijin, eventually becoming its president in November 1945.

In his early career, he was praised as a charismatic manager, who introduced new synthetic fibers which made Teijin a market leader in the fabric industry. However, he later was criticized for over-diversification, and for his refusal to surrender authority over the company despite his obvious mental decline in old age, which led Teijin to the brink of bankruptcy.

In 1947, Ōya was elected to a seat in the Diet of Japan in 1947 Upper House election from the Osaka electoral district, and was reelected for a second term, serving until June 1956 under Liberal Democratic Party (LDP) banner. From 19 October 1948 – 16 February 1949, he was Minister of Commerce and Industry under the 2nd Shigeru Yoshida administration, as well as interim Minister of Finance from 14 December 1948 to 16 February 1949. During the 3rd Yoshida administration, Ōya served as Minister of Transport from 16 February 1949 to 28 June 1950.

Ōya was married to the singer and writer Ōya Masako.

References

1894 births
1980 deaths
People from Gunma Prefecture
Members of the House of Peers (Japan)
20th-century Japanese businesspeople
Ministers of Finance of Japan
Government ministers of Japan
Hitotsubashi University alumni